A list of films produced in Hong Kong in 1954:.

1954

References

External links
 IMDB list of Hong Kong films
 Hong Kong films of 1954 at HKcinemamagic.com

1954
Lists of 1954 films by country or language
Films